Pengkalan Batu is a state constituency in Malacca, Malaysia, that has been represented in the Melaka State Legislative Assembly.

The state constituency was first contested in 2018 and is mandated to return a single Assemblyman to the Melaka State Legislative Assembly under the first-past-the-post voting system. , the State Assemblyman for Pengkalan Batu is Kalsom Noordin from United Malays National Organisation (UMNO) which is part of the state's ruling coalition, Barisan Nasional (BN).

The state constituency was first contested under the name of Bachang but was renamed to Pengkalan Batu for the 2018 election.

Definition 
The Pengkalan Batu constituency contains the polling districts of Bachang Baru, Pasir Puteh, Pengkalan Batu, Rumpun Bahagia, Peringgit, Peringgit Jaya, Bukit Palah, Seri Siantan and Bukit Piatu.

Demographics

History

Polling districts
According to the federal gazette issued on 31 October 2022, the Pengkalan Batu constituency is divided into 9 polling districts.

Representation history

Election results
The electoral results for the Pengkalan Batu state constituency in 2018 are as follows.

References

Malacca state constituencies